Pride and Prejudice is a 1980 television serial, adapted by British novelist Fay Weldon from Jane Austen's 1813 novel of the same name. It is a co-production of the BBC and the Australian Broadcasting Corporation. The five-episode dramatisation stars Elizabeth Garvie as Elizabeth Bennet and David Rintoul as Mr. Darcy.
In the US, it was broadcast by PBS television as part of Masterpiece Theatre.

The novel has been the subject of a great many television and film adaptations. This was the fifth adaptation for the BBC.  Other BBC television versions aired in 1938, 1952, 1958, 1967 and 1995.

Cast 
 Elizabeth Garvie as Elizabeth Bennet
 David Rintoul as Fitzwilliam Darcy
 Peter Settelen as George Wickham
 Priscilla Morgan as Mrs. Bennet
 Moray Watson as Mr. Bennet
 Sabina Franklyn as Jane Bennet
 Natalie Ogle as Lydia Bennet
 Tessa Peake-Jones as Mary Bennet
 Clare Higgins as Kitty Bennet
 Osmund Bullock as Charles Bingley
 Marsha Fitzalan as Caroline Bingley
 Jennifer Granville as Mrs. Hurst
 Edward Arthur as Mr. Hurst
 Irene Richard as Charlotte Lucas
 Malcolm Rennie as Mr. Collins
 Elizabeth Stewart as Lady Lucas
 Peter Howell as Sir William Lucas
 Judy Parfitt as Lady Catherine de Bourgh
 Moir Leslie as Anne de Bourgh
 Emma Jacobs as Georgiana Darcy
 Desmond Adams as Colonel Fitzwilliam
 Shirley Cain as Mrs. Phillips
 Barbara Shelley as Mrs. Gardiner
 Michael Lees as Mr. Gardiner

Episodes

References

External links 

 
 
 

1980 British television series debuts
1980 British television series endings
1980s British drama television series
BBC television dramas
1980s British television miniseries
Television series set in the 19th century
1980s British romance television series
Television series based on Pride and Prejudice
Television shows set in England
Costume drama television series
English-language television shows
Works set in country houses